Michelle Hendry (born March 19, 1970 in Terrace, British Columbia) is a Canadian former basketball player who competed in the 2000 Summer Olympics.

References

1970 births
Living people
Basketball people from British Columbia
Basketball players at the 2000 Summer Olympics
Canadian women's basketball players
Olympic basketball players of Canada
People from Terrace, British Columbia